The Ven. Richard Charles Musgrave Harvey (8 September 1864 – 20 October 1944) was a British clergyman who served as Archdeacon of Huddersfield from 1914 to 1927 and Archdeacon of Halifax from 1927 to 1935.

He was educated Marlborough College and Keble College, Oxford. His brothers included Sir John Musgrave Harvey, who was a judge on the Supreme Court of New South Wales, and Sir Ernest Musgrave Harvey, who was Chief Cashier of the Bank of England.

References

1864 births
1944 deaths
People educated at Marlborough College
Alumni of Keble College, Oxford
Archdeacons of Halifax